"Say You'll Be Mine" is a song by British dance-pop group Steps, released as a double A-side with a cover version of Kylie Minogue's "Better the Devil You Know". Steps' cover of "Better the Devil You Know" was later included as the opening track on their third studio album, Buzz (2000), but did not serve as a lead single. A limited-edition single was released as a digipack that was included with a doubled-sided poster in the sleeve. The song is the first to feature all five members on lead vocals.

"Say You'll Be Mine" / "Better the Devil You Know" was released on 13 December 1999 and reached number four on the UK Singles Chart in January 2000. The double A-side also reached the top 40 in Australia and Ireland. A new Matt Pop's Old Skool Mix was included on the remix album Stomp All Night: The Remix Anthology as the first track on the second disc.

Critical reception
Scottish newspaper Aberdeen Evening Express noted that "this is the first track where the Stepsters all take turns on lead." They added, "The instantly catchy singalong fest has a mature feel and is a dead cert to get you bopping this winter." Lucas Villa from AXS stated that Steps was at "its most adorable" on the "sweet" pop tune "Say You'll Be Mine". Can't Stop the Pop described it as "fascinating" and "one of their most brilliantly uplifting songs", adding that the track is "bursting at the seams with subtly catchy hooks." Also they noted that it is their first song to feature all five members of the group on lead vocals.

Chart performance
In the United Kingdom, "Say You'll Be Mine" / "Better the Devil You Know" entered the UK Singles Chart at number seven on 19 December 1999 and peaked at number four for two weeks in January 2000, becoming Steps' sixth consecutive top-five hit and spending 18 weeks on the chart. The double A-side also reached the top 20 in Ireland, peaking at number 13. Elsewhere in Europe, the single reached number seven in Hungary, entered the top 50 in Flanders and the Netherlands, and appeared within the top 100 in Germany and Switzerland. On the Eurochart Hot 100, the single peaked at number 19 on the issue dated 22 January 2000. In Australia, the double A-side charted for eight weeks, peaking at number 21 on the week of its debut, 30 January 2000.

Music video
A music video was made for "Say You'll Be Mine", directed by David Amphlett. He also directed the videos for "Tragedy" and "Heartbeat". It features the band acting out different films. H and Claire act out Romeo + Juliet, H and Faye act out Austin Powers: International Man of Mystery, H and Lisa act out Titanic, Lee and Claire act out There's Something About Mary, Lee and Faye act out Batman Returns and Lee and Lisa act out Armageddon. The group members also wear gold-coloured outfits while performing a dance routine.

Track listings
UK and Australian CD single
 "Say You'll Be Mine" – 3:32
 "Better the Devil You Know" – 3:49
 "Better the Devil You Know" (2T's 2 Go mix) – 5:43

UK cassette single and European CD single
 "Say You'll Be Mine" – 3:32
 "Better the Devil You Know" – 3:49

Credits and personnel

A-side: "Say You'll Be Mine"
Credits are adapted from the liner notes of Steptacular.

Recording
 Recorded at PWL Studios, Manchester, in 1999
 Mixed at PWL Studios, Manchester
 Mastered at Transfermation Studios, London

Vocals
 Lead vocals – Claire Richards, Faye Tozer, Lisa Scott-Lee, Lee Latchford-Evans, Ian "H" Watkins

Personnel
 Songwriting – Mark Topham, Karl Twigg, Lance Ellington
 Production – Dan Frampton, Pete Waterman
 Mixing – Dan Frampton
 Engineer – Dan Frampton
 Drums – Pete Waterman
 Keyboards – Andrew Frampton
 Guitar – Greg Bone
 Bass – Dan Frampton

A-side: "Better the Devil You Know"
Credits are adapted from the liner notes of Buzz.

Recording
 Recorded at PWL Studios, Manchester, in 1999
 Mixed at PWL Studios, Manchester
 Mastered at Transfermation Studios, London

Vocals
 Lead vocals – Claire Richards, Faye Tozer, Lisa Scott-Lee
 Background vocals – Lee Latchford-Evans, Ian "H" Watkins

Personnel
 Songwriting – Mike Stock, Matt Aitken, Pete Waterman
 Production – Mark Topham, Karl Twigg, Pete Waterman
 Mixing – Dan Frampton
 Engineer – Tim Speight
 Drums – Dan Frampton
 Keyboards – Karl Twigg
 Bass – Mark Topham

Charts

References

1999 singles
Steps (group) songs
Songs written by Pete Waterman
1999 songs
Jive Records singles
Pete Waterman Entertainment singles
Songs written by Andrew Frampton (songwriter)
UK Independent Singles Chart number-one singles